The Shaoxing dialect is a Wu dialect spoken in the city of Shaoxing more specifically in the city center of Yuecheng and its surrounding areas. It is a representative Wu dialect with a tripartite distinction on voiced stop initials and a textbook register split with each of the four tonal categories of Middle Chinese being divided into upper and lower registers. Within Wu, it is classified as a Northern Wu dialect belonging to the Taihu division within which it is classified under the Linshao subdivision (臨紹小片/临绍小片).

It is the pronunciation of the Shaoxing dialect which is the standard to be used on the texts of Yue opera. It is also the native language of Cai Yuanpei and Lu Xun whose Baihua was often peppered with phrases from his native dialect.

Distribution
The suburban areas to the north and east stretching from Dongpu (东浦) to Doumen (斗门) and north of Pingshui (平水) in the southern suburban areas are basically the same as that of the city center. Outside of these areas, people may still speak "Shaoxing dialect," but there are noticeable differences between these speech forms and those of the main urban area of Shaoxing.

Research into the Shaoxing dialect
The Shaoxing dialect has received an unusually large amount of attention. Documented research for the dialect has existed since the Kangxi era in the Qing dynasty, when there were three main works dealing with the Shaoxing dialect.

越语肯綮录 by Mao Qiling (毛奇龄)
越言释 by Ru Dunhe (茹敦和)
越谚 by Fan Yin (范寅)

In the modern era, Chao Yuen Ren documented four regions in Shaoxing in his Modern Wu Research (现代吴语研究). Besides Chao, the Shaoxing dialect has received the most attention from Chinese dialectologist Wang Futang (王福堂) whose 1959 Shaoxinghua jiyin (绍兴话记音) was the first full-length paper in the modern era dedicated wholly to the dialect. A concise grammar, phonology, and nearly 300 page word list of the dialect has been compiled by Yang Wei (杨葳) and Yang Jun (杨浚) in Shaoxing Fangyan (绍兴方言). There is also an English-language monograph The Phonology of Shaoxing Chinese by Zhang Jisheng and a handful of other works in Chinese.

The Shaoxing dialect is also mentioned in Zhejiang Fangyan Fenqu (浙江方言分区), Zhejiang Fangyanci (浙江方言词), and  Shaoxingshi yanyu juan (绍兴市谚语卷). As with most locations in China, Shaoxing is also covered in the Linguistic Atlas of Chinese Dialects.

Phonological inventory

Initials

Finals

Syllabic continuants:

Citation tones

Syllable structure

Initials

Rhymes

*Literary reading only.

References

Citations

Works cited

 

Wu Chinese